Étienne-Louis Arthur Fallot (September 29, 1850 in Sète, Hérault – April 30, 1911) was a French physician.

Fallot attended medical school in Montpellier in 1867. While in residence in Marseille he wrote a thesis on pneumothorax. In 1888 he was made Professor of Hygiene and Legal Medicine in Marseille. In 1888 Fallot described in detail the four anatomical characteristics of tetralogy of Fallot, a congenital heart defect responsible for blue baby syndrome.

References

 Biography on WhoNamedIt

1850 births
1911 deaths
People from Sète
19th-century French physicians